Igor Tulipanov (born 1939) is a Russian-American painter originally from St. Petersburg, Russia. Tulipanov employs Surrealist imagery in his paintings, incorporating stylistic elements from Leonardo da Vinci, Hieronymus Bosch, and Jan van Eyck.

Family History 

Tulipanov's grandfather was a General in the White Army. Igor's father, Vissarion Sergeyevich Tulipanov, was killed in 1941 during World War II.  Vissarion served in the same regiment as Russian poet Nikolai Gumilev. The Tulipanov family lived in Tsarskoe Selo, a former residence of the Russian imperial family. The poet Anna Akhmatova resided in the same house with the Tulipanovs. Akhmatova was a close friend of Valeria Sreznevskaya, a great aunt of Igor Tulipanov. These circumstances resulted in the meeting of Akhmatova and Gumilev in Tulipanovs' house.

Early life 

Igor Tulipanov began to paint in early childhood. He was a student at M. Gorohova's paint shop. He studied at Admiral Makarov State Maritime Academy, St. Petersburg for a year. Later he was enrolled at St. Petersburg Polytechnic Institute for four years. After that, Igor studied at Repin State Academic Institute of Painting Sculpture and Architecture, St. Petersburg. He did not graduate from these institutions.

In 1959, Igor Tulipanov became a student of Nikolai Akimov, artist, critic, stage director and teacher. It was under his guidance that Tulipanov received his art education. In 1964, Tulipanov graduated from Ostrovsky St Petersburg State Theatre Arts Academy. After graduation, he started a career in production design. He worked at theaters in Moscow and St. Petersburg until 1968. Igor's early exhibitions often provoked scandals, early terminations, and scathing publications in Soviet mass media.

Career 
In May 1979 Tulipanov moved to the United States to live and work.

Igor Tulipanov's paintings were sold for as much as $120,000 in the 1980s by Edward Nahkamkin, a fine art connoisseur and dealer, according to the Jewish Advocate newspaper. His paintings are exhibited in private collections and museums throughout the US, Russia, Japan, Argentina, and other countries.

He has publicly exhibited his work at Art Expos in San Francisco, Coliseum, Hong Kong, Los Angeles, and Toronto. He also had a five year contract with Edward Nakhamkin at the Fine Art Gallery in New York City.

Works 
Tulipanov worked on the Japanese Triangles series for about two decades in the 1980's and 90's. It consists of drawn and colored images derived from 17th century images of the Floating World.

Techniques 
Tulipanov used oil and acrylic paints, black and colored ink, and watercolors. He also used colored pencils for many of his monumental works, such as the twenty large panels of The Magnificent 47 Series, the Double Self-Portrait created for the United Nations contest, and the mammoth Apocalypse of Perestroika painting.

Tulipanov usually works directly onto canvas or paper without preparatory sketches. He plans the whole composition from the outset and then depicts it in its entirely.

Elements 
Tulipanov's works contain juxtapositions, humor, familiarity, mysteriousness and a wide variety of objects and characters drawn from the artist's vast knowledge of art history, architecture and the world around him. The artist draws on imagery from various cultures, including Western, Japanese, Chinese, Egyptian, Russian and Greco-Roman civilizations.

Tulipanov's colored ink representations of courtesans and kabuki actors all have a triangle as their major compositional element, which is noteworthy because this triangular element is not present in the original Japanese scenes that were used as the source. The objects that are displayed in Tulipanov's work such as minerals, flowers, birds, cats, glass paperweights, plants, landscapes, clothing, and other paraphernalia are drawn from the artist's experience with his surroundings and decorative arts.

Tulipanov is influenced by and sometimes incorporates whole scenes from Hieronymus Bosch in his paintings. Tulipanov uses symbols such as statues of pagan gods, spectacles, books, tears, eggs, and mirrors.

"The Red Room" (1968) 
The painting is a near-perfect illusion of folded pieces of paper, or objects, hanging on the wall. In the corners are painted stretcher bars, suggesting that viewers are actually looking at the back of the canvas.

The Red Room is full of curious details: the flowers that appear to be sprouting from the floor, the tiny grotesque head with a protruding pin-filled tongue, and the stretcher frame through which we see both the corner of the room and a surprising out-of-scale head. It is impossible to decide which objects are "real" and which are products of Tulipanov's imagination. Many of the objects Tulipanov depicts are deliberately confusing. Most of the objects depicted belong to the past rather than the present (the ink well, the antique furniture, the old toys on the shelves). Only a few of the items presented in his paintings could be called "necessities of life". This fact is highlighted by a partly eaten piece of coarse brown bread, resting on top of a shiny gold box in the foreground. It is the only utilitarian object depicted.

The room, like saints' chambers in fifteenth-century paintings, is located high above ground level and away from worldly distractions. Through its windows is a landscape that seems to belong in an early Netherland-ish painting.

"The Mystery" (1975-76) 
This work features three figures, and it is unclear whether they are inside or outside. There are religious images in the painting (a crucifix, a weeping angel), and Tulipanov tells us that the painting has a religious theme: weighing the balance of good and evil. Much of the image alludes to the senses. Sight is represented by the pair of glasses and the monocle; taste by the cup of coffee; smell by the flowers and the smoking pipe; and touch by the various textured surfaces.

Exhibitions 
 1962 - Hostel of Polytechnical Institute, Russia
 1963 - Cafe Rovestnik, Russia
 1964 - Pylcovo Observatory, Russia
 1975 - Nevsky Palace of Culture, group exhibition, St. Petersburg, Russia
 1994 - Alex Edmund Gallery, New York, NYC
 1995-1996 - United Nations, Geneva, Switzerland
 1997 - Consulate General of the Russian Federation, New York, NY
 1998 - United Nations, New York, NY
 2001 - Artist on the Lawn, White House, Washington, D.C.
 2003-2004 - St. Petersburg 300th Anniversary, Chelsea Art Museum, New York, NY

Personal life 

Igor married Elena Tulipanov, a fellow painter, in 1977. Elena often helps with the production of some of the painstaking detailing in the patterns and designs in the acrylic paintings. The "E" next to Igor Tulipanov's trademark signature of an "IT" monogram signifies that Elena assisted with the making of the painting.

References

External links 
 

1939 births
20th-century American painters
American male painters
21st-century American painters
21st-century American male artists
Living people
20th-century American male artists